Manus may refer to:

 Manus (anatomy), the zoological term for the distal portion of the forelimb of an animal (including the human hand)
 Manus marriage, a type of marriage during Roman times

Relating to locations around New Guinea
 Manus Plate, a tiny tectonic plate northeast of New Guinea
 Manus Province, a province of Papua New Guinea encompassing several islands, including Manus Island
 Manus District, the only district of Manus Province
Manus Island, a Papua New Guinean island in the Admiralty Archipelago
 Manus languages, languages spoken on Manus and islands close by
 Manus Regional Processing Centre, an offshore Australian immigration detention facility on Manus Island 
Manus, 2017 play by Nazanin Sahamizadeh
 Manus, 2019 short documentary film about asylum seekers in the detention centre, made by Angus McDonald

People

First name
 Manuş Baba (born 1986), Turkish singer
 Manus Boonjumnong (born 1980), Thai Olympic medalist
 Manus Boyle (born c. 1965/6), Irish Gaelic footballer
 Manus Canning (died 2018), Irish politician and paramilitary
 Manus Kelly (1978–2019), Irish businessman and rally driver
 Manus Lunny (born 1962), Irish musician
 Manus MacCloskey (1874–1963), American military officer
 Manus McGuire, Irish fiddle player
 Manus O'Cahan, leader of the 17th-century Manus O'Cahan's Regiment
 Manus O'Donnell (died 1737), Irish nobleman and soldier
 Manus O'Donnell (died 1564), Irish nobleman 
 Manus Patten (1902–1977), Irish police officer

Surname
 Dirk Manus, fictional smuggler among human characters of The Transformers franchise
 Henry Manus (1851–1931), Dutch philatelist 
 Max Manus (1914–1996), Norwegian resistance fighter during World War II
 Patrick Mac Manus (1944–2011), political activist
 Rosa Manus (1881–1942), Dutch pacifist and suffragist
 Tikken Manus (1914–2010), member of the Norwegian resistance during World War II
 Willard Manus (born 1930), American novelist

Fictional characters
 Manus, Father of the Abyss, in action role-playing game Dark Souls: Artorias of the Abyss

See also
MacManus
McManus
 Magnus (disambiguation)
 Manas (disambiguation)
 Manis (disambiguation)
 Manu (disambiguation)
 Manushya, human beings in Sanskrit